is a Japanese footballer currently playing as a forward for Mito HollyHock.

Career statistics

Club
.

Notes

References

External links

1997 births
Living people
Japanese footballers
Association football forwards
Japan Football League players
J2 League players
MIO Biwako Shiga players
Vanraure Hachinohe players